The Sony Alpha a550 (DSLR-A550) is a midrange-level digital single-lens reflex camera (DSLR) marketed by Sony and aimed at enthusiasts, it was released in August 2009. The camera features a 14.2 megapixel APS-C Type CMOS Exmor Sensor and features Sony's patented  SteadyShot INSIDE stabilisation system which works with any attached lens.
The Sony Alpha a550's main selling point is its dual Live View mode's, Sony's normal secondary; smaller sensor based Live View mode and another which uses the main sensor with no autofocus. The a550 also features a maximum of 7frame/s continuous shooting speed when operating in speed-priority mode and a maximum ISO of 1600 when in auto mode and 12800 ISO when in manual mode.

The Sony Alpha a550 is "big brother" to the Sony Alpha a500, an almost identical DSLR with a smaller 12.3 megapixel APS-C CMOS sensor, no 7frame/s continuous shooting and a lower resolution LCD.

 

Live View 
The a550 stands out from other DSLR's in its price range with its use of 2 separate Live View modes. The first mode operates in the same way other DSLR's do, by switching from using the main sensor to using a secondary, smaller sensor. This allows the a550 to autofocus in its first Live View mode. However this only provides a 90% view of the final image the main sensor will take.
The second Live View mode is named Manual Focus Check Live View. This mode uses the main 14.2 megapixel APS-C Type CMOS Exmor Sensor to provide a 100% view on the rear LCD. This mode does not allow auto focusing, hence the name Manual Focus Check Live View.
When in Live View mode the a550 uses its 3.0 TFT Xtra Fine LCD, with 921,600 dots which can be adjusted to point downwards, for overhead shooting or upwards for below eye level shooting. 
When Live View mode is not in use the optical viewfinder(OVF) is used and only provides 95% coverage of the actual image taken by the sensor.

CMOS sensor 
The a550 uses a 14.2 megapixel APS-C Type CMOS Exmor Sensor. It is a 23.4 x 15.6 mm APS-C Type CMOS Exmor Sensor with an RGB Color Filter Array, Built-in fixed low-pass filter, with 14.6 million total pixels and 14.2 million effective pixels.

This sensor is capable of recording in 5 different File qualities / formats :
• RAW (.ARW)
• RAW + JPEG Fine
• RAW + JPEG Standard
• JPEG Fine 
• JPEG Standard
and in 6 different image sizes; 
3:2
• 4592 x 3056 (L)
• 3344 x 2224 (M) 
• 2288 x 1520 (S)
16:9
• 4592 x 2576 (L)
• 3344 x 1872 (M)
• 2288 x 1280 (S)

Sony A550 Anti-Dust Technology 
To help combat dust particles on the sensor from changing lenses, Sony included both an anti-static coating on the sensor filter and anti-dust vibrations to automatically shake the sensor with the anti-shake mechanism each time the camera is shut off. There is also a manual cleaning mode, where the camera first shakes the sensor, then lifts the mirror and opens the shutter, allowing access to the sensor for use with a blower or other cleaning device.

Sony A550 Autofocus
The Sony A550 provides both manual and automatic focus control modes, set by the Focus Mode switch on the left side of the camera body, or on the lens. The Function button provides access to additional AF modes and AF Area options. The Autofocus Mode option under the Function menu offers Single-shot AF (AF-S), Automatic AF (AF-A), and Continuous AF (AF-C) settings. Single-shot AF acquires and locks focus when the shutter button is half-pressed, while Continuous AF mode constantly adjusts focus while the shutter button is half-pressed. The Automatic AF setting will lock focus on a still subject, but will switch to Continuous AF mode if the subject moves.

Autofocus Area has three options available through the Function menu: Wide, Spot, and Local (manual setting). The default option is a nine-point Wide Focus area, where the camera selects which of the nine focus points is used. (Note that only the center point utilized a cross-type sensor sensitive to detail in both the horizontal and vertical axis. The other 8 sensors are line-type, sensitive to detail in one direction only, although the four line sensors at the corners of the AF array are angled, so they'll respond to both horizontal and vertical detail.)

You can override the chosen AF mode by pressing the AF button in the center of the Multi-controller on the camera's rear panel, which will select the center AF point (the latter indicated by the target box in the center of the viewfinder). Wide AF bases its focus on the most prominent subject detail in the portion of the image that falls within the total AF area. Spot mode bases its focus on the AF point at very center of the frame. The Local setting is Sony's terminology for a manual AF area selection, and lets you manually set the main AF point by using the Multi-controller to highlight one of the nine AF points. The active AF area is briefly illuminated in the viewfinder during autofocus.

SteadyShot Stabilization 
The Sony Alpha a550 incorporates Sony's patented  SteadyShot INSIDE stabilization system which works with any attached lens. This uses a CCD-Shift system which moves the entire sensor platform in two axes. Sony claims the system is good for between 2.5 and 4 stops of compensation depending on the lens and shooting conditions, and like the entry-level Alphas it’s enabled or disabled from a menu option rather than with the physical switch of earlier models.

External links 
 Sony.co.uk 
 CNET Review.
 CameraLabs Review.

References 

550